Tom Waddell (born Thomas Flubacher; November 1, 1937 – July 11, 1987) was an American physician, decathlete who competed at the 1968 Summer Olympics, and founder of the Gay Olympics (later known as the Gay Games).

Early life
Waddell was born Thomas Flubacher in Paterson, New Jersey to a Catholic German-American family. His parents separated when he was in his teens, and at the age of fifteen he went to live with Gene and Hazel Waddell, for whom he did chores; they adopted him six years later. The Waddells were former vaudeville acrobats and encouraged Tom to take up gymnastics. Gene Waddell is one of the men in the famous photograph of acrobats balancing atop the Empire State Building. In high school, Tom Waddell excelled in athletics.

Waddell attended Springfield College in Massachusetts on a track scholarship. Originally majoring in physical education, he switched to pre-medicine following the sudden death of his best friend and co-captain of the gymnastics team, an event that moved him deeply. At Springfield, he competed on the gymnastics and football teams. In the summer of 1959, Tom worked at a children's camp in western Massachusetts, where he met his first lover, socialist Enge Menaker, then a 63-year-old man. They remained close for the rest of Menaker's life, which ended in 1985 when he was 90 years old.

Medical career
Waddell attended medical school at New Jersey College of Medicine, a division of Seton Hall University, and in 1965 undertook his medical internship at Beth El Hospital, Brooklyn. In 1965, he traveled from Brooklyn, New York to participate in the Civil Rights Movement in Selma, Alabama.

Drafted into the Army in 1966, Waddell became a preventive-medicine officer and paratrooper. Entering a course in global medicine, he protested when he found out that he would be shipped to Vietnam. Expecting a court-martial, he was instead unexpectedly sent to train as a decathlete for the 1968 Olympics.

After discharge from the army, Waddell undertook medical residencies at Georgetown University and Montefiore Medical Center in The Bronx. At Georgetown, he did research on viruses at Walter Reed Army Medical Center in Washington, D.C. In 1970, he began a graduate fellowship at Stanford University.

Waddell established his private practice on 18th Street in the Castro neighborhood of San Francisco in 1974. His medical background enabled him to find jobs easily and in exotic locales. He also served in the Middle East as medical director of the Whittaker Corporation from 1974 through 1981. Part of his job entailed serving as personal physician for a Saudi prince and a Saudi businessman and he eventually became the team physician for the Saudi Arabian Olympic team at the 1976 Montreal Olympics.

In the 1980s Waddell was employed at the City Clinic in San Francisco's Civic Center area; after his death, it was renamed for him.

Sporting career
He traveled on a U.S. State Department-sponsored track and field tour of Africa in 1962.

At the 1968 Summer Olympics in Mexico City, Waddell placed sixth among the 33 competitors. He broke five of his own personal records in the 10 events.

In 1972, in a track meet in Hawaii, he injured his knee in a high jump, which ended his career as a competitive athlete.

Gay Olympics
Soon after returning to San Francisco in 1972, Waddell joined a gay bowling league. It inspired him to consider organizing a gay sporting event modeled on the Olympics. He followed through with the idea in the early 1980s. The first "Gay Olympics" was to take place in San Francisco in 1982 in the form of a sports competition and arts festival. But a few weeks before the event was to begin, the International Olympic Committee (IOC) sued Waddell's organization over its use of the word "Olympic."

Despite the fact that the IOC had not previously protested when other groups had used the name, they alleged that allowing "Gay Olympics" would injure them. They succeeded in securing an injunction just nineteen days before the first games were to begin.

Nevertheless, the games, now re-christened the "Gay Games," went forward. They were a great success, perhaps because they emphasized sportsmanship, personal achievement, and inclusiveness to a far greater degree than the Olympics.

Personal life
While Waddell worked at Stanford in 1970, he met Lee Brian, with whom he had a five-year relationship.

In 1975, Waddell met landscape designer Charles Deaton, 12 years his senior, and they became lovers. An October 11, 1976 issue of People magazine featured the couple in a cover article. They were the first gay couple to appear on the cover of a major national magazine.

In 1981, while founding the Gay Games, Waddell met two people with whom he formed major relationships. One was public relations man and fundraiser Zohn Artman, with whom he fell in love and began a relationship. The other was lesbian athlete Sara Lewinstein. Both Tom and Sara had longed to have a child, and they decided to have a child together. Their daughter, Jessica, was born in 1983. To protect Jessica's and her mother's legal rights, Tom and Sara married in 1985.

Death
In 1985, Waddell was diagnosed with AIDS. Although dogged by the IOC's lawsuit, Waddell lived to see the success of Gay Games II in 1986, and even participated, winning the gold medal in the javelin event. He died on July 11 the following year, aged 49, in San Francisco, California. His last words were "Well, this should be interesting."

Waddell's battle against HIV/AIDS is one of the subjects of the award-winning 1989 documentary Common Threads: Stories from the Quilt. His autobiography, Gay Olympian, which he co-authored with sports writer Dick Schaap, was published in 1996.

Tributes
In 2013, Waddell was inducted into the Legacy Walk, an outdoor public display which celebrates LGBT history and people.

In 2014, a street in San Francisco formerly named after Lech Wałęsa was, due to a homophobic comment by Wałęsa, renamed Dr. Tom Waddell Place. The street already featured the Tom Waddell Health Center.

In 2014, Waddell was one of the inaugural honorees in the Rainbow Honor Walk, a walk of fame in San Francisco’s Castro neighborhood noting LGBTQ people who have "made significant contributions in their fields."

See also
 Homosexuality in sports
 Principle 6 campaign

References

External links
Short biography

1937 births
1987 deaths
American male decathletes
Athletes (track and field) at the 1968 Summer Olympics
Olympic track and field athletes of the United States
Gay sportsmen
LGBT track and field athletes
American LGBT sportspeople
Stanford University School of Medicine alumni
Springfield Pride football players
American sports physicians
LGBT physicians
LGBT people from New Jersey
AIDS-related deaths in California
American LGBT military personnel
Springfield College (Massachusetts) alumni
American people of German descent
People from San Francisco
LGBT players of American football
20th-century American LGBT people